Neal Martin is a wine critic and author based in the UK. He reviews the wines of Bordeaux, Burgundy, South Africa, and New Zealand for Vinous. In 2012, Martin authored the award-winning book, Pomerol, widely acknowledged to be the definitive book on one of Bordeaux's least known appellations.  In 2013, it won the inaugural André Simon John Avery Award and the Chairman's Award at the Louis Roederer Wine Writers Awards 2013.

Early life 

Born the eldest of four sons on 12 February 1971, in coastal Leigh-on-Sea in Essex, England, Martin attended Westcliff High School for Boys and continued on to Warwick University in 1989 where he obtained a degree in Management Science.

Career 

After graduation, Martin worked for Lloyd's of London for two years before relocating to Tokyo in 1994 to work as an English teacher. In 1996, he accepted a position within a Japanese export company working with wine.

When Martin found himself procuring such high-ticket wines as Latour and Petrus without knowing much about them, he enrolled in a WSET wine certification course. Four years later, he passed the WSET Level 4 Diploma in Wines and Spirits, had traveled regularly to European wine regions and visited nearly all the major chateaux in Bordeaux several times; all the time recording tasting notes.

In June 2003, he began writing an independent website, wine-journal.com, that quickly acquired over 100,000 readers. In 2006, he was approached by Robert Parker to join The Wine Advocate as a reviewer. In 2012, after three years of research, he published his first book, Pomerol. Comprising three main parts and totaling nearly 600 pages, one part deals with the history of the commune, another contains winery profiles organized alphabetically, and the final part considers every Pomerol cru ever made. Martin decided to publish the book himself because, he said, "I’m stubborn and didn’t want to compromise – I felt there were parts an editor would take out." Martin serves as an international wine judge in countries including the UK, South Africa, Japan, Bordeaux, Australia and at the International Wine Challenge as a Panel Chair.

On 20 November 2017, it was announced that Martin would be leaving The Wine Advocate to join Vinous as Senior Editor.

Awards 

André Simon John Avery Award for Pomerol  
 Chairman's Award at the Louis Roederer Wine Writers Awards 2013

Works 

Pomerol (2012), Wine Journal Publishing,

See also 

List of Wine Personalities

References

External links 
 https://www.vinous.com

1970 births
Living people
Wine critics
Wine writers
People from Leigh-on-Sea
Alumni of the University of Warwick